Sean Martin Pettit (born July 27, 1992) is a Canadian freeskier born in Ottawa, Ontario. He grew up in Chelsea, Quebec until the age of 7. He now resides in Pemberton, British Columbia.

Skiing career
Pettit is a big mountain skier who has appeared in many popular ski movies. He is managed by Superheroes Management Pettit was signed by Red Bull at the age of 13 becoming their youngest athlete ever. In 2008 he appeared on the Today program, along with the late Shane McConkey.

Sponsors
 K2
 Oakley
 Dakine
 Airhole

Filmography
Pettit has filmed prominent segments for ski movie pioneers Matchstick Productions.

 Superheroes of Stoke - 2012
 Attack of La Niña - 2011
 The Way I See It - 2010
 In Deep - 2009 
 Claim - 2008 

Other film appearances:
 The Masquerade - 2015
 Tracing Skylines - 2013
 WE: A Collection of Individuals - 2012
 The Ordinary Skier - 2011 
 The Massive - 2009 
 K2 Skeeze 2009 - 2009
 Show & Prove - 2008
 Believe - 2007  
 Pop Yer Bottlez - 2005

Competition Results
 2nd - 2013 Winter X Games - Real Ski Backcountry
 10th - 2012 Red Bull - Cold Rush, Silverton, Colorado
 1st - 2011 Red Bull - Cold Rush, Silverton, Colorado
 1st - 2011 Red Bull - Line Catcher, Vars-La Foret, France
 1st - 2010 Red Bull - Cold Rush, Nelson, BC
 2nd - 2010 Red Bull - Line Catcher, Vars-La Foret, France
 2nd - 2008 Red Bull - Cold Rush, Rossland, BC

Industry awards
 2015 IF3 Awards - “Best Male Freeride Segment"
 2014 Powder Video Awards - “Best Man Made Air"
 2013 Powder Video Awards - “Best Natural Air"
 2012 Powder Video Awards - “Best Male Performance”
 2011 IF3 Europe Awards - “Best Male Performance”
 2011 Powder Video Awards - “Best Powder”
 2010 Powder Video Awards - “Best Male Performance”
 2010 Powder Video Awards - “Full Throttle”
 2009 Powder Video Awards - “Breakthrough Performer”

References

1992 births
Living people
Canadian male freestyle skiers
Sportspeople from British Columbia
Skiers from Ottawa
People from Chelsea, Quebec
Canadian freeskiers